False Shame (German:Falsche Scham) is a 1926 German silent drama film directed by Rudolf Biebrach and starring Biebrach, Olaf Storm and Eric Cordell. It premiered in Berlin on 15 March 1926.

Cast
 Rudolf Biebrach as Sanitätsrat 
 Olaf Storm as Student 
 Eric Cordell as Vater 
 Niuta Helling as Mutter 
 Karin Soedenborg as  Amme 
 Richard Wirth as Bauer 
 Frida Richard as Bäuerin 
 Erra Bognar as Deren Nichte 
 Ulrich Bettac as Stadtreisender 
 Arthur Kronburger as Der vortragende Arzt 
 Willy Kroschky as Gymnasiast 
 Werner Padlowsky as Gymnasiast

References

Bibliography
 Grange, William. Cultural Chronicle of the Weimar Republic. Scarecrow Press, 2008.

External links

1926 films
1926 drama films
Films of the Weimar Republic
German silent feature films
German drama films
Films directed by Rudolf Biebrach
German black-and-white films
UFA GmbH films
Silent drama films
1920s German films
1920s German-language films